The 2011–12 Edmonton Oilers season was the 33rd season for the National Hockey League franchise that was established on June 22, 1979, and 40th season including their play in the World Hockey Association.

The Oilers failed to qualify for the Stanley Cup playoffs, the sixth consecutive season. They last qualified during the 2005–06 NHL season.

Off-season
The Edmonton Oilers drafted first overall in the 2011 NHL Entry Draft, and chose Red Deer Rebels centre Ryan Nugent-Hopkins. With the 19th pick overall (obtained from the Los Angeles Kings in a trade for Dustin Penner), the Oilers chose defenceman Oscar Klefbom.

Playoffs
The Oilers were eliminated from playoff contentions on March 22, 2012.

Standings

Schedule and results

Pre-season

Regular season

Player statistics

Skaters
Note: GP = Games played; G = Goals; A = Assists; Pts = Points; +/− = Plus/minus; PIM = Penalty minutes

Goaltenders
Note: GP = Games played; TOI = Time on ice (minutes); W = Wins; L = Losses; OT = Overtime losses; GA = Goals against; GAA= Goals against average; SA= Shots against; SV= Saves; Sv% = Save percentage; SO= Shutouts

†Denotes player spent time with another team before joining Oilers. Stats reflect time with Oilers only.
‡Traded mid-season. Stats reflect time with Oilers only.

Awards and records

Awards

Records 
 3: On October 15, 2011, Ryan Nugent-Hopkins set:
NHL record for the earliest career hat trick for a first overall pick.
Oilers record for the earliest career hat trick in fewest career games.
 8: Tied Oilers record for most points in a single game by Sam Gagner on February 2, 2012.
 11: A new Oilers record for most consecutive points by Sam Gagner on February 4, 2012.

Milestones

Transactions 
The Oilers have been involved in the following transactions during the 2011–12 season.

Trades

Free agents signed

Free agents lost

Claimed via waivers

Lost via waivers

Player signings

Draft picks 
Edmonton's picks at the 2011 NHL Entry Draft in Saint Paul, Minnesota.

See also 
 2011–12 NHL season

References

Edmon
Edmonton Oilers season, 2011-12
Edmonton Oilers seasons